List by constituency of the 577 deputies of the 11th French National Assembly (1997-2002) elected in 1997.

List of deputies by departments

Notes 

11th
11th